Air West Coast is an airline based in Greymouth, New Zealand.

It operated flights between Wellington and two West Coast towns, Westport and Greymouth, also Westport to Christchurch briefly in 2009, and also runs scenic and charter flights to various destinations in the South Island. It was last registered as operating a Cessna 150 and two Cessna 210s.

The company has ceased all scheduled flying, the Dornier has been sold, but still operates "one of the best-value" Scenic Flights to Mt Cook and Milford Sound and Air Charter Flight services throughout New Zealand.

History
Air West Coast was established by the Gloriavale Christian Community in 2002. This community had its origins at Cust in Canterbury and moved to Lake Haupiri on the West Coast in 1991. Among its other activities the community established an airstrip and maintenance base at Lake Haupiri.

Air West Coast began scheduled operations on 8 November 2002 offering flights to Wellington and Christchurch. On Mondays and Fridays a Greymouth-Westport-Wellington service was flown, while on Tuesdays and Thursdays a Greymouth-Westport-Christchurch service was flown. Both routes saw the aircraft leaving Greymouth early in the morning and returning in the late afternoon/early evening. The Wellington service continued to grow and from 1 November 2004 the Greymouth-Westport-Wellington service became a five-day-a-week Monday-to-Friday service. While the scheduled services have ended, Air West Coast continue to operate charter flights from Greymouth. One charter collects passengers off the TranzAlpine Express train at Greymouth and flies them back to Christchurch over Mt Cook and the Glaciers.

Fleet
1 Cessna 150 (ZK-CTE)
2 Cessna 210 (ZK-COY and ZK-VIR)

Ownership
Air West Coast is owned by the Gloriavale Christian Community of Haupiri, and operates out of Greymouth.

See also 

 Air transport in New Zealand
 List of defunct airlines of New Zealand
 List of general aviation operators of New Zealand

References

External links
Air West Coast website

Airlines of New Zealand